The University of Bunda Mulia (also known in  or simply as "UBM") is one of the major Indonesian private universities, located in North Jakarta, Indonesia.

Based on the selection made by the Directorate General of Higher Education from March to June 2006 to more than 2,000 universities in Indonesia, by the method of information filtering using the inputs from EPSBED, BAN PT (which is the National Accreditation Board for Higher-Education), layoffs A1, A2, A3 and B, TPSDP, DUE, QUE and INHERE, as well as from such public TEMPO & Webometrics Weekly Magazine, the result was the election of 156 universities that were considered eligible for the selection to a more advanced stage. In connection with this advanced selection, UBM was selected as one of the universities included in the  Promising Indonesian Universities. At that time, in Region III (Indonesian's education region system for the main area coverage of Jakarta, Depok, Tangerang and Bekasi), UBM was ranked one of seven universities were selected (the total number of the participants in the Region III Jakarta is 308).

History 

It was started from the establishment of the Bunda Mulia Information Management and Computer Academy by decrees of December 11, 1986 and March 30, 1987.

Along with the improvement of the Bunda Mulia's higher-education status in 2003, Yayasan Pendidikan Bunda Mulia developed a second campus situated in Jl. Lodan Kingdom No. 2, North Jakarta, with a land area of 45,000 m2. Compared to the first campus which is located on Jl. AM Sangaji No. 20, Central Jakarta, the new campus is more sophisticated, and equipped with the latest information technology facilities and infrastructures, as well as the high-speed Internet connection.

Study programs 
UBM has study programs as follows:

Three-Years Degree Diploma 
 Academy of Hospitality and Tourism (in collaboration with Regency Tafe South Australia)

Bachelors Degree 
 Information Systems (Sarjana Komputer, abbreviated as: S.Kom.), which is equivalent to Bachelor of Computer Information Systems (abbreviated as: BSc CIS)
 Engineering Informatics (Sarjana Komputer, abbreviated as: S.Kom.), which is equivalent to Bachelor of Science in Information Technology (abbreviated as: 'BSIT or B.Sc IT) or Bachelor of Information Technology (abbreviated as: BIT, BInfTech, B.Tech(IT) or BE(IT))
 Industrial Engineering (Sarjana Teknik, abbreviated as: S.T.), which is equivalent to Bachelor of Engineering (abbreviated as: BEng or BE)
 Visual Communication Design (Sarjana Desain, abbreviated as: S.Ds.), which is equivalent to Bachelor of Design (abbreviated as: B.Des. or B.Design)
 Management (Sarjana Ekonomi, abbreviated as: S.E.), which is equivalent to Bachelor of Business (abbreviated as: B.Bus or BBus)
 School of Marketing
 School of Retail
 Accounting (Sarjana Ekonomi, abbreviated as: S.E.), which is equivalent to Bachelor of Accountancy (abbreviated as: B.Acy., B.Acc. or B. Accty)
 Psychology (Sarjana Psikologi, abbreviated as: S.Psi.), which is equivalent to Bachelor of Arts in Psychology (abbreviated as: B.A. or BA)
 Communication Studies (Sarjana Ilmu Komunikasi, abbreviated as: S.Ikom), which is equivalent to Bachelor of Arts in Communication Studies)
 English Language and Culture (Sarjana Humaniora, abbreviated as: S.Hum.), which is equivalent to Bachelor of Arts in Literature
 Chinese Language and Culture (Sarjana Humaniora, abbreviated as: S.Hum.), which is equivalent to Bachelor of Arts in Literature
 Hospitality and Tourism (Sarjana Pariwisata, abbreviated as: S.Par.), which is equivalent to Bachelor of Arts in Hospitality Management

Masters Degree 
 Magister Manajemen (abbreviated as: M.M.), which is equivalent to Master of Management (abbreviated as: MM, MiM, MMgt) or Master of Business Administration (abbreviated as: M.B.A. or MBA)
 Magister Komputer (abbreviated as: M.Kom.), which is equivalent to Master of Information Technology (abbreviated as: M.Sc. IT, MSc IT or MSIT)
 Magister Ilmu Komunikasi (abbreviated as: M.Ikom.), which is equivalent to Master of Science in Communication Studies (abbreviated as: M.Sc., MSc, M.Sci., M.Si., or MS)

UBM logo

Meaning of typography 
The typography of UBM's logo, which is an acronym of the University of Bunda Mulia, is in lowercase and representing UBM's spirit of humility in its journey to always provide significant contributions to the development of information technology.

Circle ellipse (oval round) with a point-point graded curriculum symbolizes the University of Bunda Mulia's search to improve the quality of human resources engaged in globalization and the flow of information.

Meaning of colors 
 Blue is the color of engineering/technology.
 Creamy yellow symbolizes the advanced nature of thinking, innovative, sharp and brilliant in thought.
 Gray represents the progress of thought, modernity, and intelligence.

Honors and awards 
Some of the accomplishments of the UBM academic community are:
 In October 2012, two students from the Science of Communication study program became the star of an advertisement promotion "Take Me Out Indonesia" in Indosiar which will be shown for a whole month.
 In June 2012, students became one-two winner on favorite category by Facebook for the 2012 Marching Mascot Competition which was held by GrandmasHotels.com.
 In June 2012, the basketball team won second place in the Student Basketball League (LIBAMA) National Division.
 In May 2012, students in the UBM achievement in Communication Festival event held Multimedia University Department of Communication Studies National (UMN), Serpong-Tangerang. Communication Studies Program Representative UBM became finalists and winners of the competitions held at the event.
 In May 2012, a student, with her essay titled Facing Global Challenges with Condensed National identity got to national selection in an essay competition which was held by STAIN Purwokerto in cooperation with LPM Obsesi Bahasa.
 In April 2012, students reached national level in the Chinese Bridge competition at university level 11th selection Jakarta organized by the Chinese Education Coordinating Board Jakarta.
 In April 2012, representatives of the Language and Cultural Studies Program English (BBI) ranked third in the national competition Champion Spelling Bee held at the University of Indonesia (Depok) entitled ASEAN Law Students Association National English Competition.
 UBM qualify as a top 20 team national standard English debate in the event European Union Varsity Debate Championship 2011 (EU-IDC 2011), held on 17–18 November 2011 at Usmar Ismail Hall, Jakarta Film Center Building. The event was held twice, sponsored by the EU Delegation led by Charles Whitley (Head of Political, Press and Information Sections of the European Union Delegation to Indonesia, Brunei Darussalam and ASEAN). The competition involved 89 teams from universities throughout Indonesia. They competed for the trophy of the EU delegation and the opportunity to attend training in the office of the Delegation of the European Union.

See also
 List of universities in Indonesia
 Education in Indonesia

References

External links 
 

North Jakarta
Universities in Jakarta
Private universities and colleges in Jakarta